Freddie Benson is the name of:

Fred Benson (born 1984), Dutch-Ghanaian football player
Freddie Benson (iCarly)
Freddy Benson (Dirty Rotten Scoundrels)